Friends4Ever is Pip Skid's debut solo album released in 2001.

Track listing
"Intro"
"Life is 2 Easy pt. I" 
"Life is 2 Easy pt. II" (featuring Mcenroe)
"Towel Snap" (featuring Gumshoe Strut )
"Hypochondriac"
"All up in This Piece" (featuring Epic)
"True Blue" (featuring  Recyclone )
"Crantinis at 15,000 Feet" (featuring John Smith)
"Gun Lobby"
"Long Live Bruce Willis" (featuring Recyclone, Kunga219, Gruf the Druid, Shazzam  and Knowself )
"S.K.I.L.S"
"Straight Jacket"
"Raggedy Anne"
"Dish Pig" (featuring Mcenroe)
"Varycloseveins" (featuring  Unleavnd )

References

2001 albums